The 2014 World Junior Ice Hockey Championship Division I was played in two groups of six teams each. In each group the first-placed team is promoted to a higher level, while the last-placed team is relegated to a lower level. Italy won Division I B and were promoted to Division I A for 2015, while Japan finished last. However, Japan was not relegated, as Great Britain had used an ineligible player and thus saw its games later recorded as forfeits, and the team relegated. Denmark won Division I A and were promoted to the top division for 2015, while Poland finished last and were relegated to Division I B. Divisions I A and I B represent the second and the third tier of the World Junior Ice Hockey Championships.

Division I A

The Division I A tournament was played in Sanok, Poland, from 15 to 21 December 2013.

Participants

Final standings

Results
All times are local (CET – UTC+1).

Statistics

Top 10 scorers

Goaltending leaders
(minimum 40% team's total ice time)

Awards

Best Players Selected by the Directorate
 Goaltender:  David Kickert
 Defenceman:  Janis Jaks
 Forward:  Oliver Bjorkstrand

Best players of each team selected by the coaches
  Patrick Peter
  Artur Gavrus
  Georg Sorensen
  Arturs Sevcenko
  David Zabolotny
  Luka Petelin

Division I B
The Division I B tournament was played in Dumfries, Great Britain, from 9 to 15 December 2013.

Participants

Final standings

Team Great Britain was disqualified due to use of an ineligible player and was relegated to the 2015 Division II A.

Results
All times are local (GMT – UTC±00:00).

Statistics

Top 10 scorers

Goaltending leaders
(minimum 40% team's total ice time)

Awards

Best Players Selected by the Directorate
 Goaltender:  Martin Rasbanser
 Defenceman:  Yuri Sergiyenko
 Forward:  Kirill Savitsky

Best players of each team selected by the coaches
  Cedric di Dio Balsamo
  Adam Goss
  Martin Rasbanser
  Keita Kido
  Yuri Sergiyenko
  Eduard Zakharchenko

Division I B Champion

References

I
World Junior Ice Hockey Championships – Division I
World
International ice hockey competitions hosted by Poland
International ice hockey competitions hosted by the United Kingdom
World
World Junior Ice Hockey Championships